Dagkolany is a village in the Shamakhi Rayon of Azerbaijan.

External links 

Populated places in Shamakhi District